Thompson Benton Ferguson (March 17, 1857February 14, 1921) was the sixth governor of Oklahoma Territory.

Early life
Ferguson was born on March 17, 1857, near Des Moines, Iowa. The following year, he moved to Emporia, Kansas, with his parents. His mother died in 1860, and his father enlisted in the Union Army at the beginning of the Civil War. He was raised by his older sister, was educated in public schools and by teaching, he was able to finance his course through the Kansas State Normal School at Emporia.  An earnest Bible student, he was ordained as a Methodist minister and after a short time moved to Chautauqua County, Kansas. There, Ferguson taught school for nine years and married Elva Shartel on June 9, 1885, in Sedan, Kansas.

Career
In 1889, Ferguson joined the Oklahoma Land Run and staked a claim near Oklahoma City which he later sold and returned to Sedan, Kansas, where he purchased the Sedan Republican and edited it for two years.  In October 1892, he moved to Watonga, Oklahoma Territory and established the Watonga Republican newspaper which he continued to publish until his death.  He was appointed postmaster of Watonga in 1897.

President Theodore Roosevelt appointed Ferguson as the sixth Governor of Oklahoma Territory (anecdotally, when Roosevelt offered Ferguson the position via telegram, Ferguson's wife Elva accepted on his behalf without consulting him) and he assumed the office on November 30, 1901.  He served until January 5, 1906. Upon retirement, he returned to his residence in Watonga.  He made two notable attempts to return to his public service. He was a candidate for U.S. Representative from Oklahoma in 1907 and the Republican candidate for Governor of Oklahoma in 1910.

Death
Ferguson died on February 14, 1921, in Oklahoma City, Oklahoma. After a formal tribute in the Chamber of the House of Representatives, presided over by then-Governor James B. A. Robertson, his remains were returned to Watonga and were interred at Watonga City Cemetery.

Legacy
Historian John B. Meserve, who summarized the effects of the Territorial Governors in the Chronicles of Oklahoma 
...his executive functions were devoted to giving the territory an honest, sober and economical administration. Aside from this sterling service, the regime of Governor Ferguson offered no outstanding features, but it will abide in the annals of history as a most successful tenure. His term of office occasioned less criticism than any of the preceding administrations in the territory. The governor had experienced the hardships and deprivations of the early formative days of the territory and knew the problems which had confronted and still confronted the pioneer folk whose political affairs he was undertaking to guide. He possessed the qualities essential for an executive and with patient but firm resolve gave to the territory a splendid administration and will linger as an outstanding governor of the old territory.

Upon his retirement, he resumed his residence at Watonga and in 1907 made an unsuccessful race for Congress against his Democratic opponent. He continued publishing his newspaper until his death.

Notes

References

External links
 
 
 
 Encyclopedia of Oklahoma History and Culture - Ferguson, Thompson Benton
Chronicles of Oklahoma

1857 births
1921 deaths
Methodists from Kansas
Governors of Oklahoma Territory
Kansas Republicans
Oklahoma Republicans
People from Polk County, Iowa
People from Emporia, Kansas
People from Sedan, Kansas
People from Guthrie, Oklahoma
People from Watonga, Oklahoma
American newspaper editors
Methodists from Oklahoma